Rəzgov (also, Razqov, Rəzğov, and Razgov) is a village and municipality in the Lerik Rayon of Azerbaijan.  It has a population of 315.

References 

Populated places in Lerik District